Luis Caicedo may refer to:

 Luis Caicedo (footballer, born 1979), Ecuadorian football midfielder
 Luis Caicedo (footballer, born 1992), Ecuadorian football centre-back for L.D.U. Quito
 Luis Caicedo (footballer, born 1996), Colombian football midfielder for New England Revolution